Longridge is a town in Lancashire, England.

Longridge may also refer to:

People
Longridge (surname)

Places
Longridge, County Tyrone, a townland in County Tyrone, Northern Ireland
Longridge, Gloucestershire, a location in England
Longridge, Staffordshire, a location in England
Longridge, West Lothian, Scotland
Longridge Head, a headland on the Antarctic Peninsula

Other uses
R. B. Longridge and Company, a former steam locomotive works
Longridge Towers School, Berwick-upon-Tweed, England

See also
Long Ridge (disambiguation)
Longbridge (disambiguation)
Longridge railway station (disambiguation)